Gulczanka is a river of Poland, a tributary of the Noteć which it meets in the village of Gulcz.

Rivers of Poland
Rivers of Greater Poland Voivodeship